Amanita velatipes or veiled-bulb amanita is a species of Amanita from eastern North America.

Gallery

References

External links
 
 

velatipes